Daudebardia are  small air-breathing land snails or semi-slugs, terrestrial pulmonate gastropods in the family Oxychilidae, the glass snails.

Species
Species within the genus Daudebardia include:
 Daudebardia brevipes (Draparnaud, 1805)
 Daudebardia rufa (Draparnaud, 1805)
 subgenus Libania
 Daudebardia saulcyi (Bourguignat, 1852)

References

External links 
 https://www.biolib.cz/en/taxon/id2853/

Oxychilidae